Wacker Bernburg was a German association football club from the city of Bernburg, Saxony-Anhalt that was established in 1910 as Fußball Club Wacker Bernburg. The club changed its name to Sportverein Wacker Bernburg in 1926.

Wacker played in the Anhalt circuit that was part of the Mitteldeutsche Fussball Verband (Central German Football League) where they won titles in 1930 and 1931. Those wins advanced the club to the league championship round where they were put out in eighth-final matches by Sturm Chemnitz (3:1) and Wacker Halle (5:1). Wacker failed to qualify to take part in the newly formed Gauliga Sachsen (I) in 1933 and remained a Bezirksliga side until disappearing at the end of World War II in 1945.

Honours
Bezirksliga Anhalt champions: 1930, 1931

References

Das deutsche Fußball-Archiv historical German domestic league tables 

Football clubs in Germany
Defunct football clubs in Germany
Defunct football clubs in Saxony-Anhalt
Bernburg
1910 establishments in Germany
1945 disestablishments in Germany
Association football clubs established in 1910
Association football clubs disestablished in 1945